Paths of Possession is an American melodic death metal band featuring George "Corpsegrinder" Fisher of Cannibal Corpse in a more melodic environment, with song structures that have much more in common with early Bay Area Thrash than the Tampa death metal scene.

Biography 
Formed in 1999 by Randy Butman (Silhaven), Jay Fossen, Erin "Goat" Fuller (Cryptic Winds) and Richard Brunelle (ex-Morbid Angel guitarist), as Swollen, Paths of Possession is a mix of traditional heavy metal with influences of Swedish melodic death metal. Paths of Possession independently released their first CD-R demo, Legacy in Ashes, in 2000.

Following the release of Legacy of Ashes, Erin left the band to join Hell on Earth and was replaced by Brian Ridley (Cancerslug, Union Down) in 2002. Soon after, Paths of Possession was approached by Keith Suchland better known as "Splattergod" about releasing their next CD. It was mutually decided that they and Dark Faith would release a split EP, with each band contributing four songs.

While working on the split, Butman was asked to join Withered Earth in late 2002, officially doing so in January 2003, resulting in the band going on hiatus and the split being put on hold. Following the release of Withered Earths' Of Which They Bleed, the band broke up and Butman returned to Tampa and set about resurrecting the dormant Paths of Possession.

As their then-vocalist, Bill Lander, had relocated to New York, Butman asked his friend, George "Corpsegrinder" Fisher (vocalist of Cannibal Corpse) to take over the vocal position. The new line-up then opted to record their six songs in Ozone Studios, St. Petersburg, Florida, finishing in September 2003. The result was entitled The Crypt of Madness and released on Splattergod Records, limited to 1000 copies. Plans were then made between the band and Splattergod to release their full-length CD in late 2004 / early 2005.

Soon following the split's release, in early 2004, Richard Brunelle was replaced by current guitarist Jack Goodwin, and drummer Brian Ridley left to rejoin Cancerslug. Nick Goodyear (Dark Faith) stepped in to take over the drumming duties. Paths of Possession debuted their new/current lineup at the second Gathering of Lowlifes Festival on April 9, 2005, appearing with the newly reformed Hallow's Eve as well as Dark Faith, Gardy Loo and Eviscerated Zombie Tampon.

It was also during this time that Metal Blade Records owner Brian Slagel, after hearing The Crypt of Madness, approached Fisher about signing Paths of Possession, which came about in 2005. Paths of Possession entered Mana Recording Studios / Razzor Media in St. Petersburg, Florida to record Promises in Blood, with renowned metal producer Erik Rutan (Hate Eternal, Soilent Green, Into the Moat). Once the recording was finished, Promises in Blood was sent off to West West Side in New York City to be mastered by Alan Douches, best known for his work with artists such as Nile, Sepultura, Hatebreed, Clutch, Unearth, The Misfits, Mastodon, Shadows Fall, The Dillinger Escape Plan, Converge and Earth Crisis.

Current members 
Randy Butman – bass
Jay Fossen – guitar
Jack Goodwin – guitar
Nick Goodyear – drums
George "Corpsegrinder" Fisher – vocals (2003–present)

Former members 
Erin Fuller – drums
Brian Ridley – drums
Chad – drums
Bill – vocals
Richard Brunelle – guitar (died 2019)

Discography 
Legacy in Ashes (2002)
The Crypt of Madness (Paths of Possession / Dark Faith split album) (2003)
Promises in Blood (2005)
The End of the Hour (2007)

External links 
Official website (archived)

Musical groups from Tampa, Florida
Death metal musical groups from Florida
Musical groups established in 1999
American melodic death metal musical groups
Metal Blade Records artists
1999 establishments in the United States